Private Party may refer to:

Party

Music
Private Party (album), by Freddie Jackson 1995
Private Party Collectors Edition, a compilation album of Canadian DJ group, Baby Blue Soundcrew
Private Party, album by Bobby Nunn (R&B musician)
Private Party, album by Private (band)
Private Party EP, by Leona Lewis
Private Party, compilation album by Johan Gielen
Private Party November 21, 1948, an archive recording by Lead Belly 2000

Songs
Private Party (Klymaxx song), 1990
"Private Party", song by Freddie Jackson from the album Private Party (album)   1995
"Private Party", song by	Bobby Nunn (R&B musician)	1982
"Private Party", song by	Britt Ekland, Nissenson, Grody & Delia, B-side of Do It To Me	1979
"Private Party", song by The Comsat Angels from Fiction (The Comsat Angels album) 1982
"Private Party", song by Leona Lewis
"Private Party", song by Michelle Williams from Unexpected (Michelle Williams album)
"Private Party", song by	Juicy (band)	1987
"Private Party", song by	Unlimited Touch	1981
"Private Party", song by	Sean Paul from album Imperial Blaze
"Private Party", song by	Dungeonesse
"Private Party", song by Wally Jump Junior and The Criminal Element Arthur Baker (musician) 1988
"Private Party", song by Olivia with Soul Diggaz from Barbershop 2: Back in Business (soundtrack)
"Private Party", song by India Arie from Testimony: Vol. 1, Life & Relationship 
"Private Party", song by Cuban Link from Chain Reaction (Cuban Link album)
"Private Party", song by Sinjin Hawke
"Private Party", song by Keo Nozari from Love Boutique
"Ohhh (Private Party)", song by German pop singer Sarah Connor from Naughty but Nice (album)
"Private Party (Tu Para Mi)", song by Sheila E from Sex Cymbal (album)

Other uses 
Private Party (professional wrestling), a professional wrestling team consisting of Isiah Kassidy and Marq Quen